The Sloop Montgomery (1776) was an American privateer during the American Revolution.  It was captained by William Rogers, who was succeeded by William Mercier. It compiled a successful capture record during its service.  It sailed in tandem with Schuyler, both of whom shipped out of New York City harbor in 1776. 

Officers of the Montgomery:
Capt. William Mercier
Capt. William Rogers
1st Lieut. Thenius Thew
2nd Lieut. John Leaycraft

There were a few ships during the war named Montgomery.  The one concerned here was operated mostly out of New York harbor until that region fell to the British.  This sloop is not to be confused with the same named sloop out of Providence, Rhode Island (Captain Daniel Bucklin).  Extensive records concerning the New York State Sloop Montgomery can be found the volumes of, "Naval Documents of the American Revolution".

External links

Privateer ships of the United States
American Revolutionary War ships of the United States